The 17th South American Youth Championships in Athletics were held at the Estadio Modelo  in Guayaquil, Ecuador from September 25–26, 2004.

Medal summary
Medal winners are published for boys and girls.  Complete results can be found on the "World Junior Athletics History" website.

Men

Women

Medal table (unofficial)

Trophies
Final scoring for the three best countries were published.

Overall team

Individual
The trophies for the most outstanding performance were awarded to Jonathan Davis (Venezuela) and Franciela Krasucki (Brazil).  Jessica Quispe (Peru) gained the trophy for the most improved athlete.

Participation (unofficial)
Detailed result lists can be found on the "World Junior Athletics History" website. An unofficial count yields the number of about 259 athletes from about 12 countries: 

 (28)
 (4)
 (61)
 (33)
 (27)
 (49)
 (5)
 Panama (3)
 (5)
 Peru (24)
 (2)
 (18)

References

External links
World Junior Athletics History

South American U18 Championships in Athletics
2004 in Ecuadorian sport
South American U18 Championships
International athletics competitions hosted by Ecuador
2004 in youth sport
21st century in Guayaquil
Sports competitions in Guayaquil